Mohamed Gabal (born January 21, 1984) is an Egyptian indoor volleyball player. He was part of the Egypt national team at the 2008 Summer Olympics. He is a hitter and is 195 cm tall.

Clubs
Current –  Elmahala
Debut –  Elgaish

External links
FIVB profile

1984 births
Living people
Egyptian men's volleyball players
Sportspeople from Cairo
Volleyball players at the 2008 Summer Olympics
Olympic volleyball players of Egypt